St. John Baptist Church may refer to:

St. John Baptist Church (Mason City, Iowa), listed on the NRHP in Iowa
St. John Baptist Church (Lecompte, Louisiana), listed on the NRHP in Louisiana
Community of St John Baptist, Mendham, New Jersey, listed on the NRHP in New Jersey

See also
 Saint John the Baptist Church (disambiguation)